WOW New & Next is a 12-song compilation album CD of radio hits of new and rising CCM artists.  It was sold, or given free to anyone who bought any WOW compilation CD.

Track listing

See also
 WOW Series

References

WOW series albums
2010 compilation albums